WD40  may refer to:
WD-40, widely available water-displacing spray
WD-40 Company, the company manufacturing the spray
WD40 repeat, a structural amino acid motif in proteins